Voznesensk is a city in the eponymous raion in Mykolaiv Oblast, Ukraine.

Voznesensk may also refer to:

 Voznesensk (air base), Voznesensk, Mykolaiv, Ukraine; a Ukrainian airforce base
 Voznesensk Raion, an administrative district in Mykolaiv Oblast of Ukraine
 Ivanovo, a city in Russia previously known as Ivanovo-Voznesensk

See also